Lee Myung-hee (born 5 September 1943) is a South Korean business magnate and the chairwoman of the Shinsegae Group. She is the youngest daughter of Lee Byung-chul, founder of the Samsung Group and the sister of the former late chairman Lee Kun-Hee. Lee became the company's chairwoman in 1997 following its separation from Samsung and is credited for growing it into the country's second-largest retailer. With an estimated net worth of $840 million she is one of the wealthiest people in South Korea and was ranked 20th on Forbes 2017 list of 50 Richest Koreans.

Biography
Lee was born in Uiryeong County to Samsung founder Lee Byung-chul and his first wife Park Du-eul as the youngest of eight children. She attended Ewha Girls' High School and then majored in art at Ewha Womans University before marrying. After ten years of being a homemaker she became a sales executive at Shinsegae Department Store in 1979 and then its Chairwoman in 1997 after the company was separated from Samsung.

Financial scandals
During her time as chairwoman Lee has been fined on three occasions. The first was in 2006 for 350 billion won ($300 million) after she hid 800 billion wons worth of stock under different names. In 2012 the Fair Trade Commission fined Lee 4 billion won ($3.4 million) for charging different transaction fees. Then in 2015 she was fined 70 billion won for hiding 380,000 company shares worth 80 billion won ($68 million) under different names.

References

1943 births
Living people
South Korean billionaires
Female billionaires
Ewha Womans University alumni
Samsung people
People from South Gyeongsang Province
South Korean women in business
20th-century South Korean businesspeople
21st-century South Korean businesspeople
20th-century businesswomen
21st-century businesswomen
Lee family (South Korea)